Gerald Brauner is an Austrian former swimmer. He competed in the men's 200 metre breaststroke at the 1960 Summer Olympics.

References

External links
 

Year of birth missing (living people)
Living people
Olympic swimmers of Austria
Swimmers at the 1960 Summer Olympics
Place of birth missing (living people)
Austrian male breaststroke swimmers